Wheelchair basketball at the 1960 Summer Paralympics consisted of two men's tournaments. One for athletes with complete lesion paraplegia, and one for athletes with incomplete paraplegia.

Medal summary 

Source: Paralympic.org

Class A (incomplete)
Monday: USA 32 - 10 Austria
Tuesday: USA 17 - 8 Israel

Rosters A
USA:
Frank Vecerra, East St. Louis, Ill
William Johnson, Long Beach Calif.
Percy Mabee, Brooklyn, N.Y.
Richard Maduro, Madeira Beach, Fla.
Philip Hall, Indianapolis, Ind.

Class B (incomplete)
Monday: USA 37 - 6 Belgium

Rosters B
USA:
Ron Stein (age 22), Champaign, Ill.
Paul Jones (age 23), Montgommery, Pa.
John Kennedy (age 27), Jackson Heights, N.Y.
Bruce Karr (age 23), Addison, Ill
Saul Welger (age 29), Brooklyn, N.Y.
Anderson McCullough (age 25), Waukegan, Ill.
Randy Dagis (age 21), Rockford Ill.
Wayne Broeren (age 26), Champaign, Ill.
Peter Acca (age 31), Brooklyn, N.Y.

Participating nations A, B (incomplete)
Australia
Austria
Belgium
Great Britain
Israel
Netherlands (Holland)
USA
 http://www.nwba.org/news_article/show/540705?referrer_id=2077043

See also
Basketball at the 1960 Summer Olympics

References 

 
 
The information from the International Paralympic Committee (IPC) website is based on sources which does not present all information from earlier Paralympic Games (1960-1984), such as relay and team members. (Per Apr.17, 2011)

1960 Summer Paralympics events
1960
1960 in basketball
International basketball competitions hosted by Italy